Valley County is the name of several counties in the United States:

 Valley County, Idaho
 Valley County, Montana
 Valley County, Nebraska